John Galen Howard (May 8, 1864 in Chelmsford, Massachusetts – July 18, 1931 in San Francisco, California) was an American architect and educator who began his career in New York before moving to California. He was the principal architect at in several firms in both states and employed Julia Morgan early in her architectural career.

Life and career
John Galen Howard born May 8, 1864, in Chelmsford, Massachusetts. Howard was son of physician, Dr. Levi Howard and Lydia Jane Hapgood, a homemaker and he had four brothers. Howard was educated at the Massachusetts Institute of Technology (1882-1885) and the École des Beaux-Arts (1891-1893). He worked for H. H. Richardson in Brookline, for his successors Shepley, Rutan & Coolidge in Boston and for McKim, Mead & White in New York City.

Howard began professional practice in 1893, when he formed the firm of Howard & Cauldwell with engineer Samuel M. Cauldwell. In 1899 they were joined by Lewis Henry Morgan, and the firm became known as Howard, Cauldwell & Morgan. Works in the east included the Electric Tower, the centerpiece of the 1901 Pan-American Exposition. They also submitted an unsuccessful entry in the competition to design the Master Plan for the University of California, Berkeley. Despite not winning the commission outright, in 1901 Howard dissolved his partnership when he was chosen by the Regents of the university to execute the accepted plan, known as the Hearst Plan. In 1902 he reestablished his practice at Berkeley, and in 1903 formally established the School of Architecture, now part of the College of Environmental Design. As supervising architect of the University of California, Howard built extensively. His most famous buildings are the Campanile, California Memorial Stadium, Sather Gate and the Hearst Greek Theatre.

In 1904 Howard relocated his office to San Francisco, and after the 1906 San Francisco earthquake  formed the firm of Howard & Galloway with engineer John D. Galloway. This partnership was dissolved in 1908. After fifteen more years of private practice he formed the firm of John Galen Howard & Associates, with associates Henry Temple Howard, E. Geoffrey Bangs, Henry C. Collins and Charles F. B. Roeth. Howard's projects during these years include several buildings at the Alaska–Yukon–Pacific Exposition in Seattle, three of which were designed to be reused by the University of Washington, and the San Francisco Civic Auditorium. Howard's influence at the university began to wane after the retirement of president Benjamin Ide Wheeler in 1919, and he was seen as uncooperative by the Board of Regents. In 1922 the commission for the new Hearst Memorial Gymnasium was awarded to Julia Morgan and Bernard Maybeck without his input, and in 1924 his contract as supervising architect was not renewed. In 1927 he resigned as director of the School of Architecture and retired from his architecture practice, though he continued to teach at the university until his death in 1931.

Personal
He married Mary Robertson Bradbury on August 1, 1893. They had five children; Henry Temple Howard (1894–1967) was an architect who worked with his father; Robert Boardman Howard (1896–1983), became a sculptor and married another noted Bay Area sculptor, Adaline Kent (1900–1957); other children included Charles Houghton Howard (1899–1978), John Langley Howard (1902–1999) both were known artists of the time, and Jeanette Howard Wallace (1905–1998).

Legacy
Howard's primary legacy is as the founder of the formal School of Architecture at the University of California, Berkeley, and as a designer of buildings on the university campus. He is also noted as the first American employer of Julia Morgan from 1902 to 1904, though she did not look on her experience with him fondly.

Howard completed many notable projects and was elected a Fellow in the American Institute of Architects in 1901. In 1910 he was elected into the National Academy of Design as an Associate Academician.

Many of Howard's works are listed on the United States National Register of Historic Places (NRHP).

Works

Buildings for the University of California, Berkeley
 Hearst Memorial Mining Building, University of California, Berkeley, Berkeley, California (1902–07, NRHP 1982)
 Hearst Greek Theatre, University of California, Berkeley, Berkeley, California (1903, NRHP 1982)
 Senior Hall, University of California, Berkeley, Berkeley, California (1903–06, NRHP 1982)
 Doe Memorial Library, University of California, Berkeley, Berkeley, California (1904–11, NRHP 1982)
 California Hall, University of California, Berkeley, Berkeley, California (1905, NRHP 1982)
 North Gate Hall, University of California, Berkeley, Berkeley, California (1906, NRHP 1982)
 Sather Gate, University of California, Berkeley, Berkeley, California (1910, NRHP 1982)
 Durant Hall, University of California, Berkeley, Berkeley, California (1911, NRHP 1982)
 Wellman Hall, University of California, Berkeley, Berkeley, California (1912, NRHP 1982)
 Drawing Building, University of California, Berkeley, Berkeley, California (1914, NRHP 1976)
 Sather Tower, University of California, Berkeley, Berkeley, California (1914–15, NRHP 1982)
 Gilman Hall, University of California, Berkeley, Berkeley, California (1916–17)
 Hilgard Hall, University of California, Berkeley, Berkeley, California (1917, NRHP 1982)
 Wheeler Hall, University of California, Berkeley, Berkeley, California (1917, NRHP 1982)
 Dwinelle Hall Annex, University of California, Berkeley, Berkeley, California (1920)
 California Memorial Stadium, University of California, Berkeley, Berkeley, California (1922–23, NRHP 2006, rebuilt 2010–12)
 Haviland Hall, University of California, Berkeley, Berkeley, California (1924, NRHP 1982)
 LeConte Hall, University of California, Berkeley, Berkeley, California (1924, NRHP 1982)

Buildings elsewhere
 Hotel Renaissance annex, Fifth Ave and W 43rd St, New York City (1896, demolished)
 Barringer High School (former), 90 Parker St, Newark, New Jersey (1898–99, demolished)
 Cutler Majestic Theatre, 219 Tremont St, Boston, Massachusetts (1901–03)
 Electric Tower, Pan-American Exposition, Buffalo, New York (1901, temporary structure)
 Carnegie Library (former), 73 Church St, Montclair, New Jersey (1902–04, NRHP 1988)
 Cloyne Court Hotel, 2600 Ridge Rd, Berkeley, California (1904, NRHP 1982)
 Berkeley Public Library, 2090 Kittredge St, Berkeley, California (1905, demolished 1929)
 House for Adolph C. Miller, 2420 Ridge Rd, Berkeley, California (1906)
 Auditorium (later Meany Hall), University of Washington, Seattle, Washington (1907–09, demolished 1965)
 Chemistry Hall (now Architecture Hall), University of Washington, Seattle, Washington (1907–09)
 Engineering Hall, University of Washington, Seattle, Washington (1907–09, demolished)
 Italian American Bank Building, 460 Montgomery St, San Francisco, California (1907, modified)
 Empire Building, 37 Old Courthouse Sq, Santa Rosa, California (1908–10)
 Adam Grant Building, 114 Sansome St, San Francisco, California (1908)
 United States Government Building and exhibition halls, Alaska–Yukon–Pacific Exposition, Seattle, Washington (1908–09, temporary structures)
 Pierce-Arrow Building, 1001 Polk St, San Francisco, California (1912-13)
 San Francisco Civic Auditorium, 99 Grove St, San Francisco, California (1913–15)
 Berkeley National Bank Building, Center St and Shattuck Ave, Berkeley, California (1914, demolished)
 First Congregational Church, 2501 Harris St, Berkeley, California (1923–25)

Gallery of works

See also
Draper, Joan, “The Ecole des Beaux-Arts and the Architectural Profession in the United States:  The Case of John Galen Howard,” in The Architect:  Chapters in the History of the Profession, Spiro Kostof, ed., Oxford University Press, NY 1977, pages 209-237
Draper, Joan, “John Galen Howard,” in Toward a Simpler Way of Life:  The Arts & Crafts Architects of California, Rober Winter, ed., Norfleet Press of University of California Press, Berkeley Los Angeles London 1997, pages 31–40
Partridge, Loren W.  John Galen Howard and the Berkeley Campus:  Beaux-Arts Architecture in the “Athens of the West”, Berkeley Architectural Heritage, Berkeley CA 1988

Notes

References

External links

 John Galen Howard
 John Galen Howard's "City of Learning"
Guide to the John Galen Howard Papers at The Bancroft Library

 
American neoclassical architects
1864 births
1931 deaths
Architects from California
Fellows of the American Institute of Architects
People from Chelmsford, Massachusetts
University of California, Berkeley people
19th-century American architects
20th-century American architects
Members of the American Academy of Arts and Letters